Wilson Island is an island in the Gladstone Region, Queensland, Australia. It is one of eight vegetated coral cays in the Capricornia Cays National Park. It is part of the Capricornia Cays Important Bird Area. It is also part of the Great Barrier Reef World Heritage Area.

History 
The island is named after Sub-Lieutenant William T.P. Wilson of HMS Waterwitch.

Wildlife

Wilson Island is an important turtle and bird rookery fringed by a white coral beach and covered with pisonia forest.  The Capricorn silvereye, a small bird endemic to the southern Great Barrier Reef, is present.  From November to March, the island is home to wedge-tailed shearwaters and green turtles laying their eggs. The island is closed during the month of February for the bird nesting season. From January to April, baby green turtles hatch and make their way into the sea, while from June to September, humpback whales can be seen going to and from their winter feeding grounds.

Resort
The island's primary land use is as an exclusive resort, which is run by Aldesta Hotel Group. A total of eighteen guests can stay on the island at any given time, with nine tents providing accommodation. Access to Wilson Island is by boat from nearby Heron Island, which is also owned by Aldesta Hotel Group.

See also

 Great Barrier Reef
 List of islands of Australia

References

External links
Wilson Island Resort
Capricornia Cays National Park

Islands on the Great Barrier Reef
Important Bird Areas of Queensland
Seaside resorts in Australia
Gladstone Region